Marcos André de Sousa Mendonça (born 20 October 1996), known as Marcos André or sometimes Maranhão, is a Brazilian professional footballer who plays as a forward for La Liga club Valencia.

Club career

Celta
Born in São Luís but raised in Coroatá in the state of Maranhão, Marcos André represented Sobradinho, Araguaína and Guaratinguetá as a youth. In March 2015, he went on a trial at La Liga side RC Celta de Vigo, signing a two-year contract in July and being initially assigned to the reserves.

In October 2015, Marcos André was loaned to Tercera División side SD Órdenes until the end of the season. The following 31 August, he moved to fellow fourth division side UD Logroñés B also in a temporary deal; during the campaign, he also featured regularly for the main squad in Segunda División B.

On 17 July 2017, Marcos André's loan was renewed for two years, now definitely assigned to the first team. He was a regular starter for the club, scoring 11 goals in 2017–18 and ten goals in 2018–19 as the club missed out promotion in the play-offs.

Valladolid
On 23 July 2019, Marcos André agreed to a four-year deal with Real Valladolid, being assigned to the B-team in the third division. On 30 August, he was loaned to Segunda División side CD Mirandés for one year.

Marcos André made his professional debut on 31 August 2019, coming on as a second-half substitute for Mario Barco in a 2–0 away loss against CD Numancia. He scored his first goal in the second division on 29 September, netting the opener in a 1–1 away draw against Deportivo de La Coruña, and ended the season with 12 goals to his name.

Upon returning from loan, Marcos André was assigned to the first team in La Liga, and made his debut in the category on 3 October 2020 by starting in a 2–1 home loss against SD Eibar. In his second appearance on 8 November, he scored his team's second in a 2–1 home success over Athletic Bilbao.

Valencia
On 25 August 2021, after Valladolid's relegation, Marcos André moved to Valencia CF in the top tier, on a five-year deal. Used mainly as a substitute in his first season, he scored his first goal on 25 September in the fourth minute of added time to earn a draw at home to Athletic; the following 16 January in the last 16 of the Copa del Rey, he scored the only goal in the first minute at third-tier CD Atlético Baleares.

Career statistics

References

External links
 Profile at the Valencia CF website
 
 
 

1996 births
Living people
People from São Luís, Maranhão
Brazilian footballers
Association football forwards
La Liga players
Segunda División players
Segunda División B players
Tercera División players
Celta de Vigo B players
UD Logroñés B players
UD Logroñés players
Real Valladolid Promesas players
CD Mirandés footballers
Real Valladolid players
Valencia CF players
Brazilian expatriate footballers
Brazilian expatriate sportspeople in Spain
Expatriate footballers in Spain
Sportspeople from Maranhão